In the Attic may refer to:
 In the Attic (Theatre of Ice album)
 In the Attic (webcast), a live weekly webcast
 R.E.M.: In the Attic - Alternative Recordings 1985–1989, an album by R.E.M.
 In the Attic (Susan Herndon album)
 In the Attic (film)